ISCI may refer to:

Islamic Supreme Council of Iraq
Industry Standard Coding Identification
International State Crime Initiative